An elitist is someone who believes in elitism. Elitist may also refer to:

Elitist Records, a sublabel of Earache Records
Elitist (band), an American progressive metalcore band from Los Angeles, California
Elitist selection, retaining the best individuals in a generation unchanged in the next generation